Abdullah Balak (born February 3, 1938 - died February 25, 2017) taught at a number of schools and was a professor at Harran University, Department of Music. He was closely acquainted with prominent musicians of his period. Balak is notable for his knowledge of the music traditions and makams of Urfa. He has also worked on the compilation, categorization and instruction of folk dances, and received numerous awards from various organizations for his wide range of achievements.

Compositions 
 Felek sen ne feleksen
 Dağıdır yar dağıdır.
 Çağırdım bağ içinde
 Öz yurdum Urfa’da garibem
 Bülbül
 Urfalıdır benim yar
 Türkmendim rışvan oldum
 Kardaş dala konaram
 Seherden uyanasan
 Yarımın adı yaşar
 Urfanın altı bağlar
 Başında yazma var
 Fadile
 Bülbül
 Ceylan
 Bala ceylan
 Eyübün sabrı gelini
 Uykumdan seher uyandım
 Ah yar elinden
 Bülbülün bitmez çilesi
 Pencere bizde taka
 Urfa nın yolu bağdır
 Eminem
 Haticem
 Cemilem
 Baba ben dervişmiyem
 Ben sıkmalı al isterim
 Endim kuyun dibine

Compilations 
 Kara çadırın kızı
 Portakal dilim dilim
 Kımıl
 Endim kuyun dibine

See also 
 List of composers of classical Turkish music

References

1938 births
2017 deaths
Composers of Ottoman classical music
Composers of Turkish makam music